The Island of Adventure (published in 1944) is a popular children's book by Enid Blyton. It is the first book in the Adventure Series. The first edition was illustrated by Stuart Tresilian.

Plot summary
During school holidays, Jack, his sister Lucy-Ann, and their parrot Kiki go to stay with their new friends, Philip and Dinah, in their isolated old house, "Craggy-Tops", set on a steep cliff on the coast. The house is owned by Phillip and Dinah's uncle Jocelyn (a focused historian) and overworked aunt Polly, who are helped by a handyman named Joe.

Joe warns the boys that, from their tower room in Craggy-Tops, they can occasionally see the dangerous Isle of Gloom, though it is usually shrouded in fog and mist. Soon the children meet Bill Smugs who shares Jack's fascination with birds. The children sail out to the Isle of Gloom and eventually learn that Joe is working with men who are counterfeiting money in the old mines on the island.

Changes in new editions
Changes have been made to The Island of Adventure in newer editions of the book. These include:

 The title of the US edition of the book was changed to Mystery Island.
 The once handyman turned villain, Joe, was a black man named Jo-Jo in the original novel. His skin color is mentioned over 30 times. References to his ethnicity have been removed from some newer editions.

Film adaptation
A film based on the book was released in the United Kingdom in 1982. It was directed by Anthony Squire and stars Norman Bowler as Bill, Wilfrid Brambell as Uncle Jocelyn and Eleanor Summerfield as Aunt Polly. There was also a New Zealand television series, in which the first episode is based on The Island of Adventure.

References

External links
 
The Island of Adventure at the EBS website

1944 British novels
Novels by Enid Blyton
Novels set on islands
1944 children's books
Novels set in Scotland
Macmillan Publishers books